Patrick James Gormley (1934 – 25 August 2022) was a Gaelic footballer from Northern Ireland. At club level he played with Claudy and was also a member of the Derry senior football team. Gormley usually lined out as a goalkeeper.

Career

Gormley first played Gaelic football when he made the school's team as a 14-year-old, before later lining out at adult level with the Claudy club. He first appeared on the inter-county scene with Derry as a member of the minor team in 1952. Gormley claimed his first inter-county silverware when he won an Ulster JFC medal in 1955. This success earned him an immediate call-up to the senior team. Gormley, having earlier won Dr McKenna Cup and Ulster SFC medals, lined out in goal when Derry were beaten by Dublin in the 1958 All-Ireland final.

Death

Gormley died at Wrexham Maelor Hospital in Wales on 25 August 2022, at the age of 88.

Honours

Derry
Ulster Senior Football Championship: 1958
Dr McKenna  Cup: 1958, 1960
Ulster Junior Football Championship: 1955

References

1934 births
2022 deaths
Derry inter-county Gaelic footballers
Ulster inter-provincial Gaelic footballers
Gaelic football goalkeepers